Samuel Oliech (born 15 December 1993) is a Kenyan rugby sevens player. He was also part of the victorious team that won the 2016 Singapore Sevens. He competed for Kenya at the 2022 Rugby World Cup Sevens in Cape Town.

References

External links 
 
 

1993 births
Living people
Rugby sevens players at the 2016 Summer Olympics
Olympic rugby sevens players of Kenya
Kenya international rugby sevens players
Male rugby sevens players
Kenyan rugby union players